Bjørn Johan Muri (born 4 January 1990) is a Norwegian singer known for having taken part in Series 5 Idol (the Norwegian Pop Idol) in 2007 where he came runner-up.

In 2010, he took part in the Norwegian qualification for the Eurovision Song Contest 2010, with the song "Yes Man". Here he qualified for the final, where he finished fourth overall. Despite that, the single still became a #1 hit in Norway.

Muri also plays drums in a brass band, and sings in a jazz band called "Little Green Apples Falling Down From A Tree". He also sings the Norwegian version of "This Is Me" in the Disney film Camp Rock.

Discography

Album

Airwaves (2010)

Once Upon A Time (Feat. Lidolido)
Yes Man
Iron Love
Circles
Nothing Is For Real
Nobody Knows (Feat. Kelly Mueller)
The One That Got Away
Talking in My Sleep
Lights
The Beauty Of Who You Are

Singles
2009: "The Beauty of Who You Are"
2010: "Yes Man" NOR# 1, DEN No. 30
2010: "Circles"
2011: "Nobody Knows (ft. Kelly Mueller)"
2013: "I Was Somewhere"

References
.

External links
Bjørn Johan Muri MySpace website
Bjørn Johan Muri Twitter page

Bjørn Johan Muri LastFM page

1990 births
Living people
Melodi Grand Prix contestants
Idol (Norwegian TV series) participants
Norwegian pop singers
Musicians from Ålesund
21st-century Norwegian singers
21st-century Norwegian male singers